Maryna Viktarauna Litvinchuk, née Pautaran/Poltoran (Łacinka: Maryna Viktaraŭna Litvinčuk, born 12 March 1988) is a Belarusian sprint canoeist.

At the 2012 Summer Olympics in London, she won a bronze medal in the K-4 500 metres with teammates Volha Khudzenka, Iryna Pamialova, and Nadzeya Papok. At the 2016 Summer Olympics in Rio de Janeiro, she won bronze in the same event with Khudzenka, Papok, and Marharyta Makhneva. At the 2020 Summer Olympics, she won a silver medal in Women's K-4 500 metres.

She competed at the 2014 ICF Canoe Sprint World Championships, 2015 ICF Canoe Sprint World Championships, 2018 ICF Canoe Sprint World Championships, and 2019 ICF Canoe Sprint World Championships.

Family
She is married to Belarusian sprint canoeist Artur Litvinchuk.

References

External links

 
 
 

1988 births
Belarusian female canoeists
Living people
Canoeists at the 2012 Summer Olympics
Canoeists at the 2016 Summer Olympics
Canoeists at the 2020 Summer Olympics
Olympic canoeists of Belarus
Olympic silver medalists for Belarus
Olympic bronze medalists for Belarus
Olympic medalists in canoeing
ICF Canoe Sprint World Championships medalists in kayak
Medalists at the 2012 Summer Olympics
Medalists at the 2016 Summer Olympics
Medalists at the 2020 Summer Olympics
People from Pietrykaw District
Canoeists at the 2015 European Games
Canoeists at the 2019 European Games
European Games medalists in canoeing
European Games gold medalists for Belarus
European Games silver medalists for Belarus
European Games bronze medalists for Belarus
Sportspeople from Gomel Region
21st-century Belarusian women